Evolve (v3.0) is the debut album by the Florida-based nu metal music group Endo. The album was released on March 20, 2001 via DV8/Columbia Records (a division of Sony Music). The track "Malice" is present on the soundtrack for the film, Dracula 2000.

Track listing
 "Mindset"  – 1:16
 "Leave Us Alone"  – 2:43
 "Penicillin"  – 2:32
 "G.A.D."  – 2:51
 "Listen"  – 4:11
 "Drowning"  – 0:39
 "Suffer"  – 4:00
 "Malice"  – 3:40
 "The Program"  – 3:26
 "Beat Around the Bush"  – 3:51
 "Burn"  – 4:08
 "The Getaway"  – 2:46
 "Save Us"  – 3:28

Personnel
Gil Bitton – vocals
Eli Parker – guitar
Joe Suarez – drums
Zelick – bass

Production
Tom Baker – mastering
Chris Carroll – engineer
Frank Cesarano – mastering
Lou Orenstein – engineer
Paul Trust – producer, mixing
Kieran Wagner – engineer
Neil Zlozower – photography

References

2001 debut albums
Endo (band) albums
Columbia Records albums